Carole  Gray  (born 1938) is a Southern Rhodesia-born British former dancer and film actress known for her roles throughout Britain in 1960s West End musicals.

Born in Bulawayo, Rhodesia, she arrived in England in 1956 and began her 12-year acting career by appearing in the television series,The Avengers. She made her first notable film appearance as Cliff Richard's girlfriend, Toni, in The Young Ones (1961).  
 
Shortly after, she appeared predominantly in horror films like Curse of the Fly, Devils of Darkness, and Island of Terror, and was even given the nickname, "Scream Queen".  
In 1968, she returned to Africa where she appeared on stage in plays like Harvey in 1968, Fiddler on the Roof in 1969, and Taubie Kushlick's production of No, No, Nanette at the Alexander Theatre in Johannesburg, 1972.

Personal life
Carole married her first husband, Peter Graham Du Toit, in December 1957. The two later divorced, and Gray married again, this time to diamond heir, Douglas Cullinan (who was formerly married to actress, Diane Todd from 1965-1975).

Partial filmography
The Prince and the Showgirl (1957) - Dancer (uncredited)
The Young Ones (1961) - Toni
Rattle of a Simple Man (1964) - District Nurse
Devils of Darkness (1965) - Tania
Curse of the Fly (1965) - Patricia Stanley
Duel at Sundown (1965) - Nancy Greenwood
Island of Terror (1966) - Toni Merrill
The Brides of Fu Manchu (1966) - Michel Merlin
Oh! What a Lovely War (1969) - Chorus Girl (uncredited) (final film role)

References

External links

1938 births
Living people
People from Bulawayo
White Rhodesian people
Rhodesian emigrants to the United Kingdom